Jason Lee Middle School may refer to:
 Jason Lee Middle School (Vancouver), Washington, U.S.
 Jason Lee Middle School (Tacoma), Washington, U.S.